The Journal of Nonverbal Behavior is a quarterly peer-reviewed psychology journal covering the study of nonverbal communication. It was established in 1976 as Environmental Psychology and Nonverbal Behavior, obtaining its current title in 1979. It is published by Springer Science+Business Media and the editor-in-chief is Howard S. Friedman (University of California, Riverside). According to the Journal Citation Reports, the journal has a 2017 impact factor of 1.595.

References

External links

Communication journals
Springer Science+Business Media academic journals
Publications established in 1976
Nonverbal communication